Carabus maurus osculatii is a subspecies of beetle from family Carabidae, that is endemic to Iran. The species are steel coloured, and are named after its discoverer Gaetano Osculati.

References

maurus osculatii
Beetles described in 1844
Beetles of Asia
Endemic fauna of Iran